PS-101 Karachi East-III is a constituency of the Provincial Assembly of Sindh.

General elections 2018

General elections are scheduled to be held on 25 July 2018.

See also
 PS-100 Karachi East-II
 PS-102 Karachi East-IV

References

External links
 Election commission Pakistan's official website
 Awazoday.com check result
 Official Website of Government of Sindh

Constituencies of Sindh